Hope Aur Hum is a 2018 Indian Hindi-language family drama film produced by Samira Bandopadhyay under her banner Thumbnail Pictures and directed by Sudip Bandopadhyay. The film stars Naseeruddin Shah, Sonali Kulkarni, Aamir Bashir and Naveen Kasturia. It was released on 11 May 2018.

Plot 

A father obsessed with a vintage copying machine, considering it photocopying as an art. He is unable to reconcile with the fact that machine has lived its life. Ultimately sells it for the greater good of the family  but later it is known that spare parts of machine are available . Movie explores the life of each family member and how their lives are intertwined with each other.

Cast
 Naseeruddin Shah as Nagesh Srivastava (Daadu)
 Sonali Kulkarni as Adit (Daughter–in-law)
 Aamir Bashir as Neeraj (Elder Son)
 Naveen Kasturia as Nitin (Chachu)
 Kabir Sajid as Anurag 
 Virti Vaghani as Tanu
 Neha Chauhan as Auto Girl
 Beena Banerjee as Nani

Production

Development

The idea to make this film was conceived in Kolkata during the college days of Sudip Bandyopadhyay, the director of this film, who says that the characters that he has written for the film are all based on the people that he has come across in his life. About the character of Nagesh Srivastava played by Naseeruddin Shah, the director says that, "For Nagesh’s character, I drew from people in my life: a photocopy machine owner I knew, my school headmaster, my football coach and also a little bit of me."

Casting

Director Sudip Bandyopadhyay says that he wrote the character of Nagesh Srivastava keeping Naseeruddin Shah in mind while Aamir Bashir and Naveen Kasturia were selected because of their resemblance to a young Naseeruddin Shah.

Soundtrack

The soundtrack of Hope Aur Hum comprises 3 songs which were composed by Rupert Fernandes while the lyrics were written by Saurabh Dikshit.

Critical reception

Reza Noorani of The Times of India praised the acting performances of the film but felt its screenplay was incoherent and gave the film a rating of 3 out of 5. Shalini Langers of The Indian Express gave the film a rating of 1.5 out of 5 and felt that the film suffers from a dull script and poor direction. Kriti Tulsiani of News18 said that the film has good intentions but is not strong enough to leave a lasting impact. Troy Ribeiro of Hindustan Times criticized the slow pacing of the film and its outdated plot and gave the film a rating of 2 out of 5.

References

External links
  
 

Indian family films
Indian drama films
2018 drama films
2010s Hindi-language films
Hindi-language drama films